Bloomfield, Illinois may refer to:
Bloomfield, Adams County, Illinois, an unincorporated community in Adams County, Illinois
Bloomfield, Edgar County, Illinois, an unincorporated community in Edgar County, Illinois
Bloomfield, Johnson County, Illinois, an unincorporated community in Johnson County, Illinois
Bloomfield, Scott County, Illinois, an unincorporated community in Scott County, Illinois